Tephritis tanaceti is a species of tephritid or fruit flies in the genus Tephritis of the family Tephritidae.

Distribution
France, Germany, Switzerland, Austria, Hungary.

References

Tephritinae
Insects described in 1956
Diptera of Europe